The Regiment Huzaren Prins van Oranje was an armoured regiment of the Royal Netherlands Army, named after Prince Willem, Prince of Orange, eldest son of King Willem II. The regiment served as part of 43 Gemechaniseerde (Mechanized) Brigade operating the Leopard 2 main battle tank.

The Regiment Huzaren Prinses Catharina-Amalia, which is a company in the 414th Panzer Battalion, is a cavalry regiment formed in late 2020 through the amalgamation of three other Dutch cavalry regiments that, at the time, existed in suspension - the Regiment Huzaren Prins Alexander, Regiment Huzaren Van Sytzama and Regiment Huzaren Prins van Oranje. 

It was raised in 1815 as a militia Carabiniers regiment, and changed into a Cuirassier regiment (Regiment Cuirassiers nr. 9) in 1816. It fought with distinction against the Belgians during the Ten Day Campaign (Tiendaagse Veldtocht) in August 1831. In 1841, it was transformed into a Dragoon regiment (2nd Dragoon Regiment), followed by another transformation in 1867, when it became the 2nd Hussar Regiment. Several squadrons fought during the Nazi-invasion of May 1940 near Geertruidenberg en Keizersveer, preventing an SS-Brigade from crossing a vital bridge. The regiment was disbanded after the armistice in 1940, but was raised again in 1978, as the Regiment Huzaren Prins van Oranje.

Battle honour 
Tiendaagse Veldtocht 1831

External links
Dutch Cavalry Museum

Huzaren Prins van Oranje